Lishan Dula Gemechu (born February 17, 1987 in Ethiopia) is a long-distance runner for Bahrain. She competed in the marathon at the 2012 Summer Olympics, placing 62nd with a time of 2:36:20.

References

External links
 

1987 births
Living people
Ethiopian female long-distance runners
Bahraini female long-distance runners
Ethiopian female marathon runners
Olympic athletes of Bahrain
Athletes (track and field) at the 2012 Summer Olympics
Athletes (track and field) at the 2010 Asian Games
Athletes (track and field) at the 2014 Asian Games
World Athletics Championships athletes for Bahrain
Asian Games medalists in athletics (track and field)
Asian Games bronze medalists for Bahrain
Medalists at the 2014 Asian Games
Ethiopian emigrants to Bahrain
Naturalized citizens of Bahrain